Craig Warlow (born 19 March 1975) is a Welsh rugby union player. An outside half, he made 69 appearances for the Welsh regional team Newport Gwent Dragons. He previously played for Kenfig Hill RFC, Llanelli RFC, and Bridgend RFC.

He is currently head coach of Bridgend College

References

1975 births
Bridgend RFC players
Kenfig Hill RFC players
Living people
Llanelli RFC players
Dragons RFC players
Welsh rugby union coaches
Welsh rugby union players
Rugby sevens players at the 1998 Commonwealth Games